Dallol is a unique, terrestrial hydrothermal system around a cinder cone volcano in the Danakil Depression, northeast of the Erta Ale Range in Ethiopia. It is known for its unearthly colors and mineral patterns, and the very acidic fluids that discharge from its hydrothermal springs.

Etymology
The term Dallol was coined by the Afar people and means dissolution or disintegration, describing a landscape of green acid ponds and geysers (pH-values less than 1) and iron oxide, sulfur and salt desert plains. The area somewhat resembles the hot springs areas of Yellowstone National Park.

Description
A circular depression near the centre is probably a collapsed crater. The southwestern slopes have water-eroded salt canyons, pillars, and blocks. There are numerous saline springs and fields of small fumaroles.

Numerous hot springs discharge brine and acidic liquid here. Small, widespread, temporary geysers produce cones of salt. The Dallol deposits include significant bodies of potash found directly at the surface. The yellow, ochre and brown colourings are the result of the presence of iron and other impurities. Older, inactive springs tend to be dark brown because of oxidation processes.

Formation
It was formed by the intrusion of basaltic magma into Miocene salt deposits and subsequent hydrothermal activity. Phreatic eruptions took place here in 1926, forming Dallol Volcano; numerous other eruption craters dot the salt flats nearby. In October 2004 the shallow magma chamber beneath Dallol deflated and fed a magma intrusion southwards beneath the rift. The most recent signs of activity occurred in January 2011 in what may have been a degassing event from deep below the surface.

Physical properties
Dallol lies in the evaporitic plain of the Danakil depression at the Afar Triangle, in the prolongation of the Erta Ale basaltic volcanic range. The intrusion of basaltic magma in the marine sedimentary sequence of Danakil resulted in the formation of a salt dome structure, where the hydrothermal system is hosted. The age of the hydrothermal system is unknown and the latest phreatic eruption that resulted in the formation of a  diameter crater within the dome, took place in 1926. The wider area of Dallol is known as one of the driest and hottest places on the planet. Other known hydrothermal features nearby Dallol are Gaet'Ale Pond and Black Lakes.

The hydrothermal springs of Dallol discharge anoxic, hyper-acidic (pH <0), hyper-saline (almost 10 times more saline than seawater), high temperature (> ) brines that contain more than 26 g/L of iron. The main gases emitted from the springs and fumaroles are carbon dioxide, hydrogen sulfide, nitrogen, sulfur dioxide; and traces of hydrogen, argon, and oxygen. Although several other hyper-acidic (pH <2) volcanic systems exist, mainly found in crater lakes and hydrothermal sites, the pH values of Dallol decrease far below zero. The coexistence of such extreme physicochemical characteristics (pH, salinity, high temperature, lack of oxygen, etc.) render Dallol one of the very few ‘poly-extreme’ sites on Earth. This is why Dallol is a key system for astrobiological studies investigating the limits of life. Parts of the region are nearly sterile, except for a diverse array of "ultrasmall" archaea.

Dallol is highly dynamic; active springs go inactive and new springs emerge in new places in the range of days, and this is also reflected in the colors of the site that change with time, from white to green, lime, yellow, gold, orange, red, purple and ochre. In contrast to other hydrothermal systems known for their colorful pools (e.g. Grand Prismatic Spring), where the colors are generated by biological activity, the color palette of Dallol is produced by the inorganic oxidation of the abundant iron phases. Another fascinating feature of Dallol is the wide array of unusual mineral patterns, such as, salt-pillars, miniature geysers, water-lilies, flower-like crystals, egg-shaped crusts, and pearl-like spheres. The main mineral phases encountered at Dallol are halite, jarosite, hematite, akaganeite and other Fe-oxyhydroxides, gypsum, anhydrite, sylvite and carnallite.

Supposed absence of life
In October 2019, a French-Spanish team of scientists published an article in Nature Ecology and Evolution that concludes that while the salt plains are teeming with halophile microorganisms, there is no life in Dallol's multi-extreme ponds due to the combination of hyperacidic and hypersaline environments, and the abundance of magnesium (which catalyzes the denaturation of biomolecules). However another team reported for the first time evidence of life existing with these hot springs using a combination of morphological and molecular analyses. Ultra-small structures are shown to be entombed within mineral deposits, which are identified as members of the Order Nanohaloarchaea

History
The last separation from the Red Sea was about 30,000 years ago.

The discovery of the volcano by the first European settlers certainly dates from the first colonization and expeditions in the region, in the 17th or 18th century. But the hostility of the depression, the unbearable heat which reigns there, and the dangers of the site (acid basins, toxic fumes), did not favour the exploration of the zones close to the crater. On the contrary, the Erta Ale was much more accessible, especially because the part of the rift where it is located (called the Erta Ale Range), is significantly higher. The last eruption of this phreato-magmatic volcano dates back to 2011.

Gallery

See also
 List of volcanoes in Ethiopia
 Dallol – a ghost town in the Dallol crater. It had the record high average temperature for an inhabited location on Earth.

References

Bibliography
 On the Volcanoes of the World episode The Horn of Africa (2008; Science Channel)

External links

Photos from Dallol taken during an expedition to the Danakil in February 2008
YouTube
Wired
BBC
BBC

Afar Region
Astrobiology
Geologic formations of Ethiopia
Geochemistry
Hydrothermal vents
Iron minerals